Camelia Macoviciuc-Mihalcea (born 1 March 1968 in Hudești, Botoșani County) is a Romanian rower.

References

External links 
 
 
 
 
 

1968 births
Living people
People from Botoșani County
Romanian female rowers
Olympic gold medalists for Romania
Rowers at the 1996 Summer Olympics
Rowers at the 2004 Summer Olympics
Olympic medalists in rowing
World Rowing Championships medalists for Romania
Medalists at the 1996 Summer Olympics